Andrea Tavernier (Turin, December 23, 1858 - Grottaferrata, 1932) was an Italian painter, mainly of landscapes and urban vedute.

Biography
He was a pupil of Andrea Gastaldi at the Accademia Albertina of Turin. He exhibited landscape Aurea Primaverili at the 1884 Promotrice of Turin. In 1888 at the same Promotrice, he exhibited Contrasti, reproduced in engraving for the catalogue by Carlo Chessa. He traveled to Rome and along the Adriatic coast to find subjects for his paintings. He frequently exhibited at the Venice Biennale. The Biennale of 1922 displayed 36 of his works.

References

1858 births
1932 deaths
19th-century Italian painters
Italian male painters
20th-century Italian painters
Academic staff of Accademia Albertina
Italian landscape painters
19th-century Italian male artists
20th-century Italian male artists